Viulen Ayvazyan (born 1 January 1995) is an Armenian professional footballer who last played for Van.

References

External links 
 
 

1995 births
Living people
Armenian footballers
Armenia under-21 international footballers
Armenia youth international footballers
Association football forwards
Armenian expatriate footballers
Expatriate footballers in Latvia
Expatriate footballers in Belarus
Armenian Premier League players
Belarusian Premier League players
Latvian Higher League players
FC Pyunik players
FC Shirak players
FK Ventspils players
FC Dnepr Mogilev players
FC Yerevan players
Sevan FC players
FC Van players